Caleb Jeacocke (1706–1786) was an English baker, businessman and orator, known for his participation in the Robin Hood Society, a London debating society.

Life
Jeacocke carried on the business of a baker in High Street, St. Giles's, London, and became a director of the Hand-in-Hand fire office, and a member of the Skinners' Company. He frequently attended the Robin Hood debating society which held meetings in Butcher Row, Temple Bar.

The oratory of Jeacocke gained a reputation, as more effective than that of Edmund Burke and others. Oliver Goldsmith was introduced to the society by Samuel Derrick. At a time when Jeacocke was president, sitting in a large gilt chair, Goldsmith commented that nature had meant him for a Lord Chancellor; "No, no," whispered Derrick, "only for a Master of the Rolls".

Jeacocke died on 7 January 1786, in Denmark Street, Soho, London. He was author of A Vindication of the Moral Character of the Apostle Paul against the Charges of Hypocrisy and Insincerity brought by Lord Bolingbroke, Dr. Middleton, and others, London, 1765.

Notes

Attribution

1706 births
1786 deaths
English businesspeople
English writers